The Portuguese Sailing Federation (F.P.V.), based in Lisbon, is the national governing body for the sport of sailing in Portugal, recognised by the International Sailing Federation.

Notable sailors
See :Category:Portuguese sailors

Olympic sailing
See :Category:Olympic sailors of Portugal

Offshore sailing
See :Category:Portuguese sailors (sport)

Yacht Clubs
See :Category:Yacht clubs in Portugal

References

External links
 Official website
 ISAF MNA Microsite

Brazil
Sailing
1927 establishments in Portugal